Virginia's 40th House of Delegates district elects one of 100 seats in the Virginia House of Delegates, the lower house of the state's bicameral legislature. District 40, in Fairfax County and Prince William County, Virginia, has been represented by Democrat Dan Helmer since 2020.

District officeholders

Elections
In 2017, Republican incumbent Hugo was challenged by first-time candidate, Democrat Donte Tanner. The race became one of four recounts in the 2017 Virginia House of Delegates election, with control of the House decided by one seat; in the 40th district recount, Hugo won reelection by 99 votes, of roughly 30,000 cast.

In 2019, Hugo was challenged and defeated by Democrat Dan Helmer. Helmer, an army veteran who attended the United States Military Academy (West Point), campaigned on gun control, teacher pay increases and continuing Virginia's Medicaid expansion.

References

External links
 

Virginia House of Delegates districts
Government in Fairfax County, Virginia
Prince William County, Virginia